The lake Warfaaz is an artificial lake located in Wallonia near the thermal city of Spa in Ardennes in Belgium. The dam was built in 1892 on the Wayai river. The water volume is 360,000 m³ and the area is 0,08 km². It is a tourist attraction, with water sports, including Pedalo, Fishing.

References
Spa info

RWarfraaz
Warfaaz
Warfaaz
Warfaaz
Spa, Belgium